Rosgosstrakh was the largest insurance company in Russia for many years (now the second largerst, behind SOGAZ). Rosgosstrakh was the main sponsor of the Russian National Football Championship. As Russia started its 2022 Russian Invasion of Ukraine, Rosgosstrakh was sanctioned by the US on 24th February 2022.

History
Rosgosstrakh is the successor of Gosstrakh, which was founded in 1921 during the Russian Soviet Federative Socialist Republic. Gosstrakh was the Russian government-owned insurance monopolist until 1947, when Ingosstrakh was established as agency of foreign insurance. Rosgosstrakh became a state-owned joint stock company on 10 February 10 1992 by the Government Resolution of the Russian Cabinet №76 "On the establishment of the Russian State Insurance Company".

In July 2003, the controlling stake of 78%, minus four shares, was privatized. As of 2006, Rosgosstrakh was Russia's largest insurance company with US$1,528 billion in premiums per the Russian Federal Insurance Oversight Service (FIOS), aka Federal Service for Insurance Supervision (FSIS) or by the Russian acronym FSSN, the All-Russian Insurance Association (ARIA), Interfax, and public websites of the 20 leading Russian insurance companies. 
During 2007 and 2008 Rosgosstrakh bought the insurance company arm of the IFD Kapital Financial Group, consisting of Kapital Insurance, Kapital Reinsurance, Kapital Health Insurance and Kapital Life Insurance. They continue to do business under the name "Capital". On January 1, 2010 Rosgosstrakh restructured its ten regional insurance companies into the unified federal company "Group Rosgosstrakh". 

Up until September 2010, Rosgosstrakh was the only insurance company with government shares. At that time the Russian government sold the remaining 13.1% stake in the company and hence lost its power, the golden share.

In 2018, after consecutive losses, when did face profit acquired Ergo Life, a Russian based subsidiary of German Insurance company Munich Re.

References

External links
 Official site of Rosgosstrakh (in Russian) 
  Official site of Rosgosstrakh (in English)

Financial services companies established in 1992
Insurance companies of Russia
Companies of the Soviet Union
Companies based in Moscow
Companies listed on the Moscow Exchange